Indiana's 3rd congressional district is a congressional district in the U.S. state of Indiana. Based in Fort Wayne, the district takes in the northeastern part of the state. In 2023, this district will include all of Adams, Allen, Blackford, DeKalb, Huntington, LaGrange, Noble, Steuben, Wells and Whitley counties, as well as northern Jay and northeast Kosciusko counties.

The district is currently represented by Republican Jim Banks who succeeded fellow Republican Marlin Stutzman.  Stutzman succeeded Mark Souder in a special election in 2010. Souder resigned after admitting his involvement in an affair with a married female member of his congressional staff.

Congressman Marlin Stutzman announced he would not run for reelection and instead campaign for the Republican nomination to succeed retiring Senator Dan Coats. On May 12, 2015 Indiana State Senator Jim Banks announced his intention to run for Indiana's Third Congressional District. Another Indiana State Senator, Liz Brown, also announced she would seek the Republican nomination.

The district and its predecessors have typically been strongly Republican. It occasionally elected Democrats in the past, but the Democrats have not come close to winning it since 1994. Pockets of Democratic influence exist in Fort Wayne itself, which frequently elects Democratic mayors and occasionally sends Democrats to the state legislature. However, it is nowhere near enough to overcome the overwhelming Republican lean of the rest of the district.

Election results from presidential races

List of members representing the district

Current counties in the district 
As of 2013.

 5 Blackford County exists in both the 3rd and 5th Congressional districts. One city, Montpelier, exists in the 3rd congressional district, and one city, Hartford City, exists in the 5th congressional district. One township, Harrison, exists in the 3rd congressional district, and three townships, Washington, Licking, Jackson, exist in the 5th congressional district.
 64 Kosciusko County exists in both the 2nd and 3rd Congressional districts. Half of one city, Warsaw exists in the 2nd and 3rd Congressional districts, twelve townships, Clay, Etna, Franklin, Harrison, Jefferson, Lake, Plain, Prairie, Scott, Seward, Turkey Creek, Van Buren exist in the 2nd Congressional District, and three townships, Jackson, Washington, Wayne exist in the 3rd Congressional District. They are partitioned by Indiana S 1000 W35, North 200W and West 700N.

Cities of 10,000 or more people
(2010 Census)
 Fort Wayne - 253,691
 New Haven - 15,709
 Huntington - 17,391
 Wabash - 10,666
 Warsaw - 13,559
 Auburn - 13,086

2,500 - 10,000 people
(2010 Census)
 Berne - 3,999
 Decatur - 9,405
 Huntertown - 4,810
 Leo-Cedarville - 3,603
 Hartford City - 6,220
 Butler, DeKalb County, Indiana - 2,684
 Garett, DeKalb County, Indiana - 6,286
 Grant Township - 3,245
 Jackson Township - 3,064
 Portland - 6,161
 LaGrange - 2,625
 Kendallville - 9,862
 Ligonier - 4,405
 Angola - 8,612
 Bluffton - 9,897
 Ossian - 3,289
 Columbia City - 8,750

Election results

2002

2004

2006

2008

2010

2012

2014

2016

2018

2020

2022

Historical district boundaries

See also

Indiana's congressional districts
List of United States congressional districts

References

 Congressional Biographical Directory of the United States 1774–present

External links
Rep. Jim Banks's official House of Representatives website

03
Constituencies established in 1823
1823 establishments in Indiana